D7 motorway, formerly Expressway R7 is a highway northwest from Prague to Chomutov and the German border.

Under Construction

Images

External links
  (Czech only)

R07